Unwanted Superheroes (also known as USH) was a five-piece emo-core band from Pembroke Pines, Florida.

Formed in 2002, Unwanted Superheroes shot up the South Florida music scene in only a flash.  Rising up from out of nowhere in the small town of Pembroke Pines, Florida, they went on to share the stage with bands such as Thursday, Coheed and Cambria, Emery, 18 Visions, A Static Lullaby, Brazil, The Beautiful Mistake, Misery Signals, Secret Lives of the Freemasons, Hawthorne Heights, The Fully Down, Rise Against, Alexisonfire, Silverstein, This Day And Age, Remembering Never, The Panic Division, Hopesfall, Burns Out Bright, codeseven, Anatomy of a Ghost, LoveHateHero, The AKA's, The Bensons, The Ombudsmen, Disclaimer 70, Jack Morgan BSc, The Black Maria, Rory, and Madison.

History
On July 9, 2004, they released their first and only full-length album titled, "You Don't Need This As Bad As I Do"². The band then suffered the loss of lead guitarist Matt Ross. Shortly after, Trevor O'Hare filled in as their new lead guitarist.  Shortly thereafter, in the summer of 2006, they released their final set of songs before the band split in December 2006.  This EP titled "The 2006 Summer EP", consisted of only 4 songs in total.

Reunion Shows
On May 6, 2007, USH reunited to play one final show at the JCC Battle of the Bands show.  USH has stated several times that this will be their last show together, ever.

On August 16, 2008, USH played a final reunion show.

Band members
 Matt Burns - Vocals
 Mark Annino - Drums
 Raf Navarro - Bass/Vocals
 Trevor O'Hare - Guitar
 Matt Fernandez - Guitar/Vocals

Previous band members
 Alex Fox-Alvarez - Drums
 Phil Edens - Bass

Discography
 You Don't Need This As Bad As I Do - July 2004
 The 2006 Summer EP - July 2006

References
 http://www.myspace.com/unwantedsuperheroes
 http://www.interpunk.com/item.cfm?Item=58563&
 https://archive.today/20130124115544/http://www.garageband.com/artist/USH

External links
 Unwanted Superheroes at MySpace

Musical groups from Florida